Treznea (lit. "The Devil's Fountain") is a commune in Sălaj County, Crișana, Romania. It is composed of two villages, Bozna (Szentpéterfalva) and Treznea. These were part of Agrij Commune until 1995, when they were split off to form a separate commune.

History 
It is the site of the Treznea massacre, which occurred on September 9, 1940, during the handing over of Northern Transylvania from Romania to Hungary, pursuant to the Second Vienna Award.

Population
 973 Romanians (94.09%)
 59 Romani (5.72%)
 2 Hungarians (0.19%)

Sights 

 Wooden Church in Bozna, built in the 18th century, historic monument
 Bay Castle in Treznea, built in the 19th century, historic monument

References

Communes in Sălaj County
Localities in Crișana